Knight Island State Park is a state park near North Hero, Vermont comprising most of 125-acre Knight Island on Lake Champlain, except for 10 acres on the southern tip that are private. The park is administered by the Vermont Department of Forests, Parks, and Recreation, as part of the Vermont State Park system. The park can only be reached by boat, and visitors must make their own arrangements to get there. There is no dock.

Activities include hiking, fishing, picnicking, wildlife watching, camping and winter sports.

Knight Island features seven primitive campsites, with composting outhouses and no potable water supply. Reservations are necessary for camping.

References

State parks of Vermont
Protected areas of Grand Isle County, Vermont
Islands of Grand Isle County, Vermont
Islands of Vermont
North Hero, Vermont
1990 establishments in Vermont